The 2009 Danish Cup Final was the final and deciding match of the 2008–09 Danish Cup. It took place on Thursday 21 May 2009 at Parken Stadium in Copenhagen. The then-leader in the Superliga F.C. Copenhagen met AaB, who was in 7th.

F.C. Copenhagen won the match 1–0 on a 31st-minute goal by midfielder William Kvist, securing the club their fourth cup title after they won in 1995, 1997 and 2004. 

The two clubs also met in the 2004 final, that also ended in a 1–0-win for Byens Hold.

The Pokal-fighter-award was handed to AaB's captain Thomas Augustinussen.

Peter Rasmussen refereed the match in front of a crowd of 29,249 in a Parken being rebuilt.

Road to Copenhagen

 Both teams started in third round.
 Square brackets [ ] represent the opposition's division.

Match details

See also
2008–09 Danish Cup for details of the current competition.

Danish Cup Finals
Danish Cup Final 2009
Danish Cup Final 2009
Cup
Sports competitions in Copenhagen
May 2009 sports events in Europe
2009 in Copenhagen